Del Reyes de Guzman (born January 9, 1963) is a Filipino politician who served as the 11th Mayor of Marikina from 2010 to 2016. He had previously served as Representative for the city's lone district from 2001 up to its division in 2007, wherein he served as the representative for the second district until 2016.

Education
De Guzman had his elementary education at H. Bautista Elementary School, secondary at Roosevelt College in Marikina and his college degree at the University of the East.

Political career
De Guzman served as Municipal Councilor from 1988–1992 and Vice Mayor of Marikina from 1992–2001 under Mayor Bayani Fernando.

House of Representatives (2001 - 2010)
In the 2001 General election, de Guzman was elected to the House of Representatives as the congressman for Marikina's Lone District. He would later be re-elected to a second term in 2005.

Upon the division of the lone district through Republic Act No. 9364, of which he was the principal author, he was redistricted to the second district. He ran for representative in the same district during the 2007 election, being elected and becoming its first representative. During the election, his campaign manager Mila Andrade was assassinated on May 3, 2007 by a man riding a motorcycle

Legislative portfolio

Mayor of Marikina (2010–2016)
In 2010, de Guzman opted to run for mayor to succeed term-limited mayor Marides Fernando, with physician and councilor Jose Fabian Cadiz being his running mate. De Guzman defeated then-outgoing vice mayor Marion Andres and Alfredo Cheng with 66.34% of the vote, along with his running mate who was elected vice mayor with 57.91% of the vote. 

In 2013, de Guzman would be re-elected along with Cadiz with 88.21% of the vote.

In 2016, de Guzman was defeated for in his bid for a third and final term, with Marcelino Teodoro being elected as his successor.

Personal life
De Guzman was married to Amalia de Guzman. She died on January 1, 2014, at the age of 46.

See also
Marikina
House of Representatives of the Philippines
Legislative districts of Marikina

References

External links
Marikina Website

|-

|-

|-

1963 births
Living people
Aksyon Demokratiko politicians
Liberal Party (Philippines) politicians
Members of the House of Representatives of the Philippines from Marikina
Mayors of Marikina
Metro Manila city and municipal councilors
People from Marikina